Katarzyna Krawczyk (born 6 September 1990) is a Polish freestyle wrestler. She is a bronze medalist at the World Wrestling Championships and a two-time bronze medalist at the European Wrestling Championships. She competed in the women's freestyle 53 kg event at the 2016 Summer Olympics, in which she was eliminated in the quarterfinals by Sofia Mattsson.

Career 

She competed in the women's 53 kg event at the 2015 World Wrestling Championships held in Las Vegas, United States.

In 2020, she won one of the bronze medals in the women's 55 kg event at the Individual Wrestling World Cup held in Belgrade, Serbia. In 2021, she won one of the bronze medals in her event at the 2021 Poland Open held in Warsaw, Poland.

In 2022, she won the silver medal in the women's 55 kg event at the Yasar Dogu Tournament held in Istanbul, Turkey. In April 2022, she won one of the bronze medals in the women's 53 kg event at the European Wrestling Championships held in Budapest, Hungary. A few months later, she won the gold medal in her event at the Matteo Pellicone Ranking Series 2022 held in Rome, Italy. She competed in the 53kg event at the 2022 World Wrestling Championships held in Belgrade, Serbia.

Achievements

References

External links

 

1990 births
Living people
People from Mrągowo County
Sportspeople from Warmian-Masurian Voivodeship
Polish female sport wrestlers
Olympic wrestlers of Poland
Wrestlers at the 2016 Summer Olympics
European Wrestling Championships medalists
World Wrestling Championships medalists
21st-century Polish women